Scrobipalpa cultrata is a moth in the family Gelechiidae. It was described by Povolný in 1971. It is found in Algeria and northern Iran.

The forewings are dirty light grey to brownish with three dark, brownish to blackish marks, surrounded by many dark grey to blackish scales. The hindwings are dirty grey-whitish.

References

Scrobipalpa
Moths described in 1971